RK Eglė Vilnius, a.k.a. Eglė-Šviesa for sponsorship reasons, is a Lithuanian women's handball club from Vilnius.

Egle was third in the Soviet Championship in 1981 and 1987, and in 1988 it won the EHF Cup beating Budućnost Titograd in the final. It also reached the competition's final in the inaugural 1982 edition and 1989, losing to RK Trešnjevka and Chimistul Râmnicu Vâlcea respectively. Its major international success following the dissolution of the Soviet Union was reaching the Champions League's group stage in 1999.

Titles

 EHF Cup
 1988
 Lithuanian League
 1st: 1990, 1991, 1992, 1993, 1994, 1996, 1997, 1998, 2000, 2001, 2002, 2003, 2004, 2006, 2007, 2006, 2007, 2010

References

Lithuanian handball clubs
Sport in Vilnius
Lithuanian Women's Handball League clubs